The 1998 Football League Trophy Final (known as the Auto Windscreens Shields Trophy for sponsorship reasons) was the 15th final of the domestic football cup competition for teams from the Second and Third Division of the Football League. The match was played at Wembley on 19 April 1998, and was contested by Bournemouth and Grimsby Town. The match was won by Grimsby Town, with Wayne Burnett scoring the winning golden goal in the 2–1 victory during extra-time. The attendance was the largest for a sporting event in England that weekend.

Grimsby's victory was the first of a Wembley double that season as later they went on to triumph in the 1998 Football League Second Division play-off Final.

Background
Bournemouth and Grimsby entered the fixture in a similar positions with both clubs fighting for promotion from the Football League Second Division. Grimsby were 3rd trailing Watford and Bristol City where Bournemouth were outside the play-offs in 8th. Bournemouth were competing in their second Football League Trophy final having won the first ever tournament in 1984, Grimsby were competing in their first final and were playing at Wembley for the very first time.

Match details

Route to the final

Bournemouth

Grimsby Town

External links
Official website
Match result & lineups at Soccerbase

EFL Trophy Finals
Football League Trophy Final 1998
Football League Trophy Final 1998
Football League Trophy Final